Mount Abunug a dormant volcano in the Philippines.

References

Mountains of the Philippines
Landforms of Leyte (province)
Inactive volcanoes of the Philippines